Aponogeton natans is a species of aquatic plant in the family Aponogetonaceae.

Description
Aponogeton natans grows as a submerged aquatic plant.

Distribution and habitat
Aponogeton natans is native to India, Sri Lanka, Bangladesh and Myanmar. It grows in wetlands and rice fields.

References

natans
Freshwater plants
Flora of the Indian subcontinent
Flora of Myanmar